The women's 50 metre freestyle competition at the 2018 Pan Pacific Swimming Championships took place on August 12 at the Tokyo Tatsumi International Swimming Center. The defending champion was Cate Campbell of Australia.

Records
Prior to this competition, the existing world and Pan Pacific records were as follows:

Results
All times are in minutes and seconds.

Heats
The first round was held on 12 August from 10:00.

Only two swimmers from each country may advance to the A or B final. If a country not qualify any swimmer to the A final, that same country may qualify up to three swimmers to the B final.

B Final 
The B final was held on 12 August from 17:30.

A Final 
The A final was held on 12 August from 17:30.

References

2018 Pan Pacific Swimming Championships